The 1962 Atlantic hurricane season featured Hurricanes Daisy and Ella – two tropical cyclones that showed the latest dates for the fourth and fifth named storms on record since tropical cyclones were first named in the North Atlantic ocean, starting in 1950, when they both formed on September 29 and October 14. On the same hand, it was the least active since 1939, with only five named storms. Although the season officially began on June 15, the first named storm did not form until August 26, the third-latest date. Hurricane Alma brushed the Outer Banks before becoming extratropical southeast of New England, destroying hundreds of boats and producing beneficial rainfall. In late August, Tropical Storm Becky developed unusually far east in the Atlantic Ocean, becoming the easternmost storm on record to recurve to the northeast. Celia followed in the September, forming east of the Lesser Antilles and executing a loop near Bermuda before dissipating. Hurricane Daisy, the latest fourth named storm, was the costliest of the season, leaving about $1.1 million in damage in New England (1962 USD). The storm dropped the highest rainfall total on record in Maine, and its precipitation caused 22 traffic fatalities. The final hurricane – Ella – the latest fifth named storm – was also the strongest, remaining offshore of the eastern United States but causing two deaths.

In addition to the five named storms, there were three non-developing tropical depressions. The first struck Texas in August, causing street flooding and killing three. The second of three formed off the west coast of Florida and flooded widespread areas after 1 in 100 year rainfall. The floods affected 5,000 houses and caused millions in damage. The third of three non-developing storms moved across the Caribbean before striking Nicaragua in October. The season officially ended on November 15.

Season activity 
The hurricane season officially began on June 15, 1962. The National Hurricane Center began operations with no new equipment, and the warning agency instead opted to improve with the existing equipment. The agency had access to a system of radars that extended from Brownsville, Texas, to Eastport, Maine, which was set up in 1961. Although satellite imagery technology was available, the system was not fully active to provide daily images of Atlantic hurricanes. The season officially ended on November 15.

During the season, three hurricanes developed from five named storms. This was below the average of 10 storms per season, and represented the fewest tropical storms since 1939. Four of the five storms developed from the Intertropical Convergence Zone. The decreased activity is partially due to the westerlies extending further south than usual, as well as a persistent ridge. In addition, temperatures in the eastern United States were cooler than usual. Activity through September 10 was the quietest in 30 years.

The only region of the United States threatened by hurricanes was New England, although no stations recorded hurricane-force winds in the country. This was the first such occurrence during the 20th century that no tropical storms or hurricanes hit the country. Overall damage was the lowest in several years.

Systems

Tropical Storm One 

The first storm of the season originated from a cold front that stalled over the western Atlantic Ocean on June 28. A frontal low developed a day later off the coast of South Carolina. The low moved northward and northward, gradually acquiring tropical characteristics. The Atlantic hurricane reanalysis committee assessed that the system transitioned into a tropical storm by late on June 30, while moving over the Outer Banks of North Carolina. The storm at the time was co-located with an upper-level low, suggesting characteristics of a subtropical cyclone. Based on reports from ships and land stations, the maximum sustained winds were estimated at 65 mph (100 km/h). On July 1, an approaching cold front steered the storm away from the coast. The storm gradually weakened and transitioned back into an extratropical cyclone late on July 2. Turning to the north, the storm moved across Newfoundland, and curved to the west and southwest, striking New Brunswick and Nova Scotia. The storm turned back to the northeast, remaining offshore Nova Scotia until it was absorbed by an approaching extratropical storm on July 6.

While in its formative stages, the storm dropped torrential rainfall in coastal portions of North Carolina, causing locally heavy crop damage. Cedar Island reported  of rainfall in an 18-hour period; at the time, it was the second-highest single-day rainfall total.

Hurricane Alma 

A tropical wave developed into a tropical depression along the southeast Florida coast on August 26. It moved northward along the coast, located beneath an anticyclone that aided in its intensification. This marked the latest development of the first storm since 1941. Alma steadily intensified as it paralleled the coastline of the Carolinas, becoming a hurricane on August 28 a few miles off the coast of Cape Hatteras. Despite its proximity, the storm produced peak wind gusts of only  in Nags Head. Wind gusts downed a power pole in Hatteras, which caused an hour long power outage for one-third of the town. Damage in the state amounted to $35,000.

After passing the Outer Banks, Alma continued to intensify further, reaching peak winds of 85 mph (140 km/h) about 85 mi (140 km) south of Nantucket. Despite its intensity, the hurricane never developed a well-defined eye. Alma quickly weakened to a tropical storm as it made its closest approach to New England, due to cooler water temperatures. However, Alma produced strong waves that destroyed over 100 boats. Damage from the storm was estimated at less than $1 million, though its rains were beneficial to drought-stricken areas of New England. Precipitation extended northward through Maine, and storm damage was reported as far north as Portsmouth, New Hampshire. Slick roads resulted in several traffic accidents, although there were no deaths. After moving by the region, Alma turned to the southeast due to a high-pressure system to its north. It became extratropical on August 30.

Tropical Depression Three 

It moved slowly to the north-northwest around a ridge without intensifying beyond winds of 30 mph (45 km/h). The system encountered wind shear throughout its duration, which displaced the convection from the center to its northeast. The depression struck just west of the Texas/Louisiana border on August 29 before dissipating on August 30. However, heavy amounts of precipitation fell across Louisiana, peaking at  near Hackberry. Rainfall extended northeastward through Arkansas and Missouri. On August 29 as the depression moved ashore, heavy rainfall caused street flooding in Cameron, Louisiana. The storms damaged 115 houses or trailers, of which one was destroyed. There were 30 people injured, of whom 18 required hospital attention, and there were three deaths.

Tropical Storm Becky 

A tropical disturbance emerged from Africa in late August and developed into a weak tropical depression on August 27. For about 30 hours, the system affected the Cape Verde islands with rainfall, during which it moved slowly to the west and west-northwest. Late on August 28, it was estimated that the depression intensified into a tropical storm. The next day, satellite imagery observed a well-developed tropical cyclone in the far eastern Atlantic Ocean. On that basis, the Weather Bureau initiated advisories on Tropical Storm Becky, despite the agency only issuing advisories for storms west of 35° W. Around that time, the storm moved over an area of anomalously warm water temperatures, which allowed for its intensification. On August 30, Becky turned to the north and northeast due to an approaching trough, becoming the easternmost cyclone since 1886 that a storm began a motion to the north.

Tropical Storm Celia 

However, satellite imagery indicated that it could have become a tropical cyclone a day earlier. The storm quickly attained peak winds of 70 mph (110 km/h), and on September 13 a hurricane watch was issued for the northern Leeward Islands. However, Celia passed beneath a mid- to upper-level trough and quickly weakened. By late on September 14, a hurricane hunters flight indicated that the storm's structure no longer resembled that of a tropical cyclone. The next day, Celia weakened to a tropical depression, and the Weather Bureau discontinued tropical cyclone advisories. It turned to the north and later to the east, passing well southeast of Bermuda. On September 18, Celia began executing a loop to the north, during which it re-intensified into a tropical storm, as reported by ships. Celia became extratropical on September 21, without having affected land.

Tropical Depression Six 

An upper-level low spawned a tropical depression off the west coast of Florida on September 20. The depression moved very slowly to the north-northwest, which produced heavy rainfall from Naples to Tampa, Florida. A developing cyclone off the Carolinas caused the dissipation of the depression on September 23.

The rains in Sarasota were the highest since 1945, and some locations experienced 1 in 100 year rainfall totals. The flooding entered over 5,000 houses, which forced the evacuation of more than 100 families. The floods also caused schools to close in three counties. In addition, floodwaters affected thousands of acres of farmlands in six counties, and some did not dry out for several weeks. Wind gusts reached  in eastern Florida, and more than 20,000 people were left without power. There was one death in the state related to the storm, and damage was estimated at $2.78 million.

Hurricane Daisy 

On September 29, reconnaissance aircraft indicated the formation of a tropical depression to the east of the Lesser Antilles. For several days it moved to the west-northwest, passing just north of the islands without intensifying further. This was due to its presence beneath an upper-level trough, although the system began intensifying as the trough dissipated. On October 2, after turning to the northwest between two high-pressure areas, the depression strengthened into Tropical Storm Daisy. Developing an anticyclone aloft, the storm continued to gradually intensify, reaching hurricane strength on October 3. Two days later, Daisy turned to the north-northeast and attained peak winds of 105 mph (165 km/h). On the following day, the extratropical remnants of Daisy struck Nova Scotia just south of Yarmouth and later re-emerged into the Atlantic, before dissipating south of Newfoundland on October 9.

Across the region, the rains caused widespread flood damage. In Maine, wind gusts reaching  destroyed hundreds of small boats, along with high waves from the storm. In New England, Daisy left five injuries, one direct death, and about $1.1 million in damage. Slick roads, however, resulted in 22 traffic fatalities. Rough seas killed six people in the province.

Hurricane Ella 

In the middle of October, an area of disturbed weather persisted across the Turks and Caicos Islands, associated with an upper-level low. On October 14, a tropical depression developed and moved northward. A day after forming, it intensified into Tropical Storm Ella as it began a track to the northwest, located east of a weakening upper-level trough. On October 17, Ella strengthened further into a hurricane as an anticyclone was gradually developing. Ella became extratropical on October 22 over the northern Atlantic as it interacted with an approaching cold front. Shortly thereafter its remnants moved over Newfoundland before dissipating on October 23.

Ella is historically notable for its role in the Cuban Missile Crisis. The storm greatly complicated naval operations relating to the 'quarantine' blockade of Cuba and badly damaged several Soviet nuclear-armed submarines en route to the island, contributing to the escalation of the B-59 Incident. Early in its duration, Hurricane Ella briefly threatened to strike the North Carolina coastline. Although it remained offshore, the hurricane produced significant beach erosion along the coast. There were two associated deaths from a missing motor boat that left Charleston, South Carolina. The crew of two was declared deceased after a Coast Guard, Navy, and Air Force search failed to locate their bodies. There was no damage in Canada from its remnants.

Hurricane Ten 

On November 25, a cold front was stalled over the western Atlantic Ocean. The storm remained nearly stationary for several days near the coast, drifting westward and later to the south. On November 27, the storm's wind structure became more symmetric, with an inner core developing inside the larger extratropical low. Based on ship reports near the center, the system transitioned into a hurricane early on November 28; due to its interaction with the extratropical storm, the system was potentially a subtropical cyclone, although the lack of satellite imagery prevented such a classification. By later on November 28, the hurricane weakened to a tropical storm, affected by wind shear. By that point, the storm had turned to the east, followed by a turn to the northwest and later west-southwest on the next day. Late on November 30, satellite imagery indicated an eye-like feature in the center of the storm. A day later, the storm re-intensified into a hurricane, reaching its peak intensity of 90 mph (150 km/h). On December 2, the hurricane turned back to the southwest as it made its closest approach to the Outer Banks. Stronger wind shear caused the hurricane to weaken to a tropical storm again on December 3, as an approaching cold front steered the storm northeastward. Two days later, the storm transitioned back into an extratropical storm to the east of the Outer Banks, briefly regaining hurricane intensity on December 5. A day later, a larger extratropical storm over the northeastern United States absorbed the former hurricane.

For several days, the storm meandered off the southeast coast of the United States, producing high tides and beach erosion from Florida to Virginia; many of these areas were affected by a severe nor'easter in March 1962. The storm's interaction with a ridge to its northeast produced a strong pressure gradient, resulting in gale-force winds across the Virginia and North Carolina coast. In Virginia, a dredge involved in the construction of the Chesapeake Bay Bridge–Tunnel broke loose and rain aground. High waves washed away dunes, wrecked coastal houses, and sank several boats, including a ferry. The storm washed out a temporary bridge and deepened a temporary inlet on Hatteras Island north of Buxton, both the aftermath of the March 1962 storm. As a tropical cyclone, the hurricane produced tropical storm force winds along the North Carolina coast. Rainfall associated with the storm was generally light, except for portions of the Outer Banks and in Georgia.

Other systems 

On April 28, a trough existed north of Puerto Rico, spawning a tropical depression on April 30. The system moved northeastward, potentially developing into a tropical storm. An approaching cold front absorbed the system on May 3.

On September 27, a tropical depression developed east of the Lesser Antilles. It moved through the islands without intensifying beyond winds of 30 mph (45 km/h). The depression later crossed the entirety of the Caribbean Sea. On October 3, it struck northeastern Nicaragua, before becoming a remnant low-pressure area the following day over Guatemala.

Storm names 
The following names were used for named storms (tropical storms and hurricanes) that formed in the North Atlantic in 1962. Because of the season's relatively low impact, no storms were retired during the 1962 season, and the name Celia was used for the first time.

Season effects 
The following table lists all of the storms that have formed in the 1962 Atlantic hurricane season. It includes their duration, names, landfall(s) (in parentheses), damages, and death totals. Deaths in parentheses are additional and indirect (an example of an indirect death would be a traffic accident), but were still related to that storm. Damage and deaths include totals while the storm was extratropical, a wave, or a low, and all of the damage figures are in 1962 USD.

See also 

 List of Atlantic hurricanes
 Atlantic hurricane season
 Australian region cyclone seasons: 1961–62 1962–63
 South Pacific cyclone seasons: 1961–62 1962–63
 South-West Indian Ocean cyclone seasons: 1961–62 1962–63

References

External links 
 Monthly Weather Review

 
Articles which contain graphical timelines